The X-Potential is a role-playing game adventure published by TSR in 1987 for the Marvel Super Heroes role-playing game.

Contents
The X-Potential is a campaign setting for the Advanced rules that describes the alternate future setting of the MX series, covering the society, technology, important NPCs, the Mutant Affairs Committee, McGrafton Industries, and the Mutant Resettlement Center. It includes an alternate-world tabloid newspaper.

Publication history
MX2 The X-Potential was written by Mark Acres, with a cover by Mike Machlan and John Statema, and was published by TSR, Inc., in 1987 as a 32-page book, a tabloid sheet, and an outer folder.

Reception

Reviews

References

Marvel Comics role-playing game adventures
Role-playing game supplements introduced in 1987